The 1999–2000 Russian Superleague season was the fourth season of the Russian Superleague, the top level of ice hockey in Russia. 20 teams participated in the league, and HC Dynamo Moscow won the championship.

Regular season

Playoffs

Relegation

External links
Season on hockeyarchives.ru

Russian Superleague seasons
1999–2000 in Russian ice hockey leagues